Heliofungia is a genus of stony corals in the family Fungiidae. These corals are found in shallow water in the Indo-Pacific region. They are zooxanthellate corals and were formerly considered to be a subgenus of the genus Fungia.

Species
The World Register of Marine Species currently lists the following two species:
Heliofungia actiniformis Quoy & Gaimard, 1833
Heliofungia fralinae (Nemenzo, 1955)

References

Fungiidae
Scleractinia genera
Cnidarians of the Pacific Ocean
Cnidarians of the Indian Ocean
Marine fauna of Asia
Marine fauna of Oceania
Marine fauna of Southeast Asia